Tarnówko may refer to the following places:
Tarnówko, Greater Poland Voivodeship (west-central Poland)
Tarnówko, Kuyavian-Pomeranian Voivodeship (north-central Poland)
Tarnówko, West Pomeranian Voivodeship (north-west Poland)